George Anthony Nelson (26 April 1919 – 9 March 1981) was an Australian rules footballer who played with Collingwood and Richmond in the Victorian Football League (VFL).

Prior to his football career, Nelson served in the Australian Army during World War II.

Notes

External links 

George Nelson's playing statistics from The VFA Project
George Nelson's Profile from Collingwood Forever

1919 births
1981 deaths
Australian rules footballers from Victoria (Australia)
Collingwood Football Club players
Richmond Football Club players
Williamstown Football Club players